The 2012 SEC Championship Game was played on December 1, 2012, in the Georgia Dome in Atlanta, Georgia, and determined both the 2012 football champion of the Southeastern Conference (SEC). The game featured the Georgia Bulldogs, winners of the SEC Eastern Division versus the Alabama Crimson Tide, the winner of the SEC Western Division.

Because Alabama and Georgia were both respectively ranked 2 and 3, the game was considered a de facto semifinal game, as the winner would automatically face the undefeated Notre Dame Fighting Irish in the National Championship with no vote necessary. Georgia was the designated "home" team. The game was televised by CBS Sports for the twelfth straight season. Kickoff was scheduled at 4:00 (EST). Alabama won the game 32–28 improving their record to 4–4 in the title game. Alabama's Eddie Lacy was named MVP after rushing for 181 yards and two touchdowns. The game at the time was the most watched college football game of the 2012 season (it would be surpassed by the 2013 BCS National Championship Game on January 7, 2013) with the game receiving a 10.1 share or 21.0 million viewers tuned in.

Game summary
After the first-ever scoreless first quarter in this game's history, the teams traded touchdowns in the second quarter. Alabama kicked a field goal as time expired in the first half to take a 10–7 lead.

Georgia took the game's largest lead in the third quarter with two touchdowns, the second of which was an Alec Ogletree 55-yard return of a blocked field goal. Alabama answered with a rushing touchdown and two-point conversion by T. J. Yeldon. Eddie Lacy's second touchdown of the game put the Tide ahead as the fourth quarter began. These two Alabama running backs each finished the game with over 150 yards; they are the first duo of running backs in SEC championship history to each have even 100 yards.

The Bulldogs once again went in front by three on their very next drive, when they took only two minutes to answer with a Todd Gurley touchdown run. Georgia's defense continued to allow Alabama yardage on the ground, but they forced an Alabama punt with 7:14 remaining, still up by three.  Georgia could only keep the ball for four plays and two minutes, though, as they punted back to the Tide with 5:24 left in the game.

Georgia's defense was "stacking the line," using an extra defender to prevent gains on the ground.  Alabama took advantage: on first down with three minutes left, quarterback A. J. McCarron used play action to free up Amari Cooper for a 45-yard touchdown pass.

The Alabama defense forced Georgia to punt with two minutes left.  But, Georgia used all of their timeouts while their defense also held firm. A punt gave Georgia one last drive, starting from their own 15-yard line.  It seemed as if the game was over when Dee Milliner appeared to have intercepted a pass on the fourth play of the drive.  However, replay overturned the interception ruling, and Georgia again had an opportunity.

Three more long passes brought the Bulldogs all the way to the 8-yard line with the clock winding down. With 9 seconds to play, an Aaron Murray pass toward the end zone was deflected toward Chris Conley in the field of play. Surprised to see the ball—he was not the intended receiver on the play—Conley caught the pass as he fell down in-bounds at the 5-yard line.   The clock ran out before Georgia could run another play.

Scoring summary

Notes
This was Alabama's 8th appearance in the title game. The previous seven appearances were all against the Florida Gators. This was Georgia's 5th appearance and second consecutive SEC Championship game. This was the first meeting between the schools since 2008. From 2006 to 2012, the winner of this game played in the BCS National Championship Game seven straight times with a record of 6–1 (LSU was defeated by fellow SEC member Alabama following winning the 2011 SEC Championship Game).

Their victory in this game, along with their ranking based on their season-long performance, earned Alabama a spot in the BCS National Championship Game, where they defeated Notre Dame, 42–14.

References

External links
 "2012 SEC Championship: #2 Alabama vs. #3 Georgia" Replay of the 2012 SEC Championship Game

Championship
SEC Championship Game
Alabama Crimson Tide football games
Georgia Bulldogs football games
December 2012 sports events in the United States
2012 in sports in Georgia (U.S. state)
2012 in Atlanta